Charles Albert Vanik (April 7, 1913 – August 30, 2007) was a Democratic politician from Ohio. He served in the United States House of Representatives from 1955 to 1981.

Early life
Vanik was born in Cleveland, Ohio, the son of Stella (née Kvasnicka) and Charles Albert Vanik, a butcher. He was of Czech ancestry. His maternal grandmother, Alžběta Seberová (1868–1948), was born in village Hracholusky, southern Bohemia (then part of the Austria-Hungary). Vanik completed undergraduate studies and a law degree at Western Reserve University. After serving on the Cleveland City Council from 1938 to 1939 and the Ohio State Senate from 1940 to 1942, Vanik enlisted in the U.S. Naval Reserve, seeing action in both the Atlantic and Pacific theaters. After the war, Vanik served as a city judge from 1946 to 1954.

United States House of Representatives
In 1954, he ran for Ohio's 21st congressional district. The district, located on Cleveland's East Side, was evenly divided between African Americans, who were then solidly Republican voters, and whites, who were mostly Democrats. In the Democratic primary, Vanik defeated longtime incumbent Congressman Robert Crosser as well as African-American challenger John Holly, founder of the Negro Future Outlook League.

In the general election, Vanik defeated African-American Republican Francis E. Young, who helped organize the Cleveland branch of the NAACP. Vanik shifted districts in 1968 to the neighboring , to make way for Louis Stokes whose growing political operation had challenged him in previous races, defeating Frances P. Bolton, who had served the district since 1939. Vanik served in the district until 1981.

In 1974, Vanik sponsored the Jackson–Vanik amendment with Sen. Henry "Scoop" Jackson, which denied normal trade relations to certain countries with non-market economies that restricted the freedom of emigration. The amendment was intended to allow refugees, particularly religious minorities, to escape from the Soviet Bloc. During this time, Vanik was the chair of the House Ways and Means Subcommittee on Trade.

He used to insert into the Congressional Record what he called the "Annual Corporate Tax Study" in which he'd list corporations that paid little to no federal income taxes.

In 1982, Vanik contested for the Democratic nomination for lieutenant-governor of Ohio as running mate with Ohio Attorney General William J. Brown who was running for governor. The ticket lost to Richard F. Celeste and Myrl Shoemaker. Vanik was known for wearing black bow ties with every suit.

Death

Vanik died in his sleep on August 30, 2007, at his home in Jupiter, Florida. He was 94. He was survived by his wife, Betty, one son, one daughter and two grandchildren.

References

External links

 Charles A. Vanik A Memorial site created by the Vanik Family
 Retrieved on 2009-5-16
 Obituary from The Cleveland Plain Dealer

1913 births
2007 deaths
Politicians from Cleveland
American people of Czech descent
United States Navy sailors
Cleveland City Council members
Ohio lawyers
Case Western Reserve University alumni
Case Western Reserve University School of Law alumni
Recipients of the Order of Tomáš Garrigue Masaryk
Democratic Party Ohio state senators
Democratic Party members of the United States House of Representatives from Ohio
20th-century American politicians
20th-century American lawyers